"Cat in the Rain" is a  short story by American author Ernest Hemingway (1899-1961), first published by Richard Hadley of Boni & Liveright in 1925 in the short story collection In Our Time. The story is about an American man and wife on vacation in Italy. Critical attention focuses chiefly on its autobiographical elements and on Hemingway's "theory of omission" (iceberg theory).

Background 

According to the book Hemingway's Cats, Hemingway wrote the story as a tribute to his wife Hadley. The couple had only been married a few years, and lived in Paris where she was left alone for hours at a time while her husband worked. She asked for a cat but he told her they were too poor. When she became pregnant he wrote "Cat in the Rain", apparently based on an incident in Rapallo (where they visited Ezra Pound in 1923). Hadley found a stray kitten and said, "I want a cat ... I want a cat. I want a cat now. If I can’t have long hair or any fun I can have a cat.”

Plot summary

“Cat in the Rain” is a short story about an American couple on vacation in Italy set in or around the couple's hotel, which faces the sea as well as the "public garden and the war monument".  Throughout the story it rains, leaving the couple trapped in their hotel room. As the American wife watches the rain, she sees a cat crouched “under one of the dripping green tables.”    Feeling sorry for the cat that “was trying to make herself so compact she would not be dripped on,” the wife decides to rescue "that kitty.”

On her way downstairs, the American wife encounters the innkeeper, with whom she has a short conversation. In this encounter, Hemingway specifically emphasizes how the wife "likes" the innkeeper, a word that is repeated often throughout the stories of In Our Time: "The wife liked him. She liked the deadly serious way he received any complaints. She liked his dignity. She liked the way he wanted to serve her. She liked the way he felt about being a hotel-keeper. She liked his old, heavy face and big hands".

When the American wife finally arrives outside that cat is gone, and, slightly crestfallen, she returns to the room alone. The American wife then has a (rather one-sided) conversation with her husband about the things she wants with her life, particularly how she wants to settle down (as opposed to the transient vacation life the couple has in the story): “I want to eat at a table with my own silver and I want candles. And I want it to be spring and I want to brush my hair out in front of a mirror and I want a kitty and I want some new clothes.”  However, her husband, George, continues to read his books, acting dismissively of what his wife “wants.” The story ends when the maid arrives with a “big tortoise-shell cat pressed tight against her and swung down against her body,”   which she gives to the American wife.

Writing style 
Hemingway biographer Carlos Baker writes that Hemingway learned from his short stories how to "get the most from the least, how to prune language, how to multiply intensities, and how to tell nothing but the truth in a way that allowed for telling more than the truth".  The style has become known as the iceberg theory, (or sometimes the "theory of omission,") because in Hemingway's writing the hard facts float above water while the supporting structure operates out of sight.  Hemingway wrote in Death in the Afternoon, "If a writer of prose knows enough about what he is writing about he may omit things that he knows and the reader, if the writer is writing truly enough, will have a feeling of those things as strongly as though the writer had stated them. The dignity of movement of an iceberg is due to only one-eighth of it being above water." Hemingway learned how to achieve this stripped-down style from Ezra Pound, who, according to Hemingway, "had taught him more 'about how to write and how not to write' than any son of a bitch alive".  Similarly, Hemingway was influenced by James Joyce who taught him "to pare down his work to the essentials".

The iceberg theory is evident in "The Cat in the Rain", where he goes beyond mere reporting and tries to convey a sense of reality.  The idea that there is "something below the surface" to this story is particularly evident in relation to the cat. The cat is not just a cat. Instead, as Professor of English Shigeo Kikuchi writes, the animal's nature is shrouded in mystery: "The moderately distant location of the room and the two words suggestive of the cat’s size, have the effect of concealing from the reader the cat’s true size and sort [which makes] it impossible to identify the “cat in the rain." But what does the cat represent? One explanation that scholars have offered is that the cat is a physical manifestation of the wife's desire for a child: "The cat stands for her need of a child".

This ending is both abrupt and ambiguous, and “hinges on the mystery of the tortoise-shell cat's identity. We do not know whether it is the "kitty" the wife spotted outside and so do not know whether she will be pleased to get it."

A New York Times book reviewer comments on the plot of the very short story, writing “that is absolutely all there is, yet a lifetime of discontent, of looking outside for some unknown fulfillment is compressed into the offhand recital.”

Reception
"Cat in the Rain" was first published in New York in 1925, as a part of the short story collection In Our Time, which derives its title from the Anglican Book of Common Prayer ("Give us peace in our time, O Lord").  It contains notable short stories such as "Indian Camp" and "Big Two-Hearted River”.

When it was published, In Our Time received acclaim from many notable authors of the period, including "Ford Madox Ford, John Dos Passos, and F. Scott Fitzgerald for its simple and precise use of language to convey a wide range of complex emotions, and it earned Hemingway a place beside Sherwood Anderson and Gertrude Stein among the most promising American writers of that period."  In a New York Times book review from October 1925, titled Preludes to a Mood, the reviewer praised Hemingway for his use of language, which he described as "fibrous and athletic, colloquial and fresh, hard and clean; his very prose seems to have an organic being of its own. Every syllable counts toward a stimulating, entrancing experience of magic."   Author D.H. Lawrence said that In Our Time was "a series of successive sketches from a man's life...a fragmentary novel...It is a short book: and it does not pretend to be about one man. But it is. It is as much as we need know of the man's life. The sketches are short, sharp, vivid, and most of them excellent."  Hemingway biographer commented that Hemingway's writing illustrated that the author had "felt the genius of Gertrude Stein's [his longtime mentor and friend] Three Lives and had obviously been influenced by it."

In the media 
"Cat in the Rain"  has inspired a short (9 minute) film by Directors Matthew Gentile and Ben Hanks. Made in 2011, the movie stars actors Brian Caspe, Veronika Bellová and Curtis Matthew.

References

External links
Ernest Hemingway Collection, JFK Library

Short stories by Ernest Hemingway
1925 short stories